Ralph Arnold Tudor (1902–1963) was an American builder, civil engineer and Under Secretary of the United States Interior Department. The Ralph A. Tudor Medal awarded by the Society of American Military Engineers is named for him.

Biogrpahy
Ralph Arnold Tudor was born in Colorado Springs on March 19, 1902, and grew up in western Oregon. He earned a degree in civil engineering at Cornell University. He graduated from the U.S. Military Academy at West Point in 1923, and was an officer in the Corps of Engineers until leaving the Army in 1929. He later worked for a number of construction companies in the San Francisco area where he specialized in road and bridge construction.

He married Mary Lucile Taylor in 1925, and they had one daughter.

He returned to the Army during World War II, serving as a colonel in the Corps of Engineers from 1941 to 1945.

Tudor was acquainted with Douglas McKay, a former governor of Oregon, who was appointed Secretary of the Interior by President Dwight D. Eisenhower. In March 1953 McKay arranged to have Tudor appointed Under Secretary of the Interior. As Under Secretary, Tudor was responsible for much of the administrative work of the department. He helped select persons to run the various bureaus that were part of the Interior Department, including the Bureau of Mines, the Bureau of Reclamation, and the Bonneville Power Administration. Tudor coordinated the Department's legislative program and was involved with a number of environmental issues that arose during the early years of the Eisenhower administration, including the Hells Canyon and Echo Park controversies. Tudor served until September 1954 when he resigned to return to his construction business in California.

He died from a heart attack at his home in Atherton, California on November 12, 1963, and was buried at West Point Cemetery.

References

External links
Papers of Ralph A. Tudor, Dwight D. Eisenhower Presidential Library
Finding aid to the Tudor Engineering Company Records, Bancroft Library

1902 births
1963 deaths
20th-century American engineers
American military engineers
Burials at West Point Cemetery
Cornell University College of Engineering alumni
United States Army colonels
United States Army Corps of Engineers personnel
United States Army personnel of World War II
United States Military Academy alumni